Amphibolips quercusjuglans, the acorn plum gall wasp, is a species of gall wasp in the family Cynipidae.

References

External links

 

Cynipidae
Insects described in 1862
Taxa named by Carl Robert Osten-Sacken
Gall-inducing insects
Oak galls